Georgios Saranti Papasideris (1875 in Koropi – 1920) was a Greek athlete and weightlifter.

Career
Papasideris was born in Koropi.

He competed at the 1896 Summer Olympics in Athens. He competed in the shot put, placing third.  His best throw was 10.36 metres.

Papasideris also threw the discus, placing somewhere between fifth and last (ninth) place.

In the two-handed weightlifting event, now known as clean and jerk, Papasideris tied for fourth place with Carl Schuhmann of Germany.  They had both lifted 90.0 kilograms.

References

External links

Athletes (track and field) at the 1896 Summer Olympics
19th-century sportsmen
Weightlifters at the 1896 Summer Olympics
Greek male discus throwers
Olympic athletes of Greece
Olympic weightlifters of Greece
Olympic bronze medalists for Greece
Greek male shot putters
Greek male weightlifters
1875 births
1920 deaths
Medalists at the 1896 Summer Olympics
Olympic bronze medalists in athletics (track and field)
People from East Attica
Date of birth missing
Date of death missing
Place of death missing
Sportspeople from Attica